The Teddy Wilson Trio & Gerry Mulligan Quartet with Bob Brookmeyer at Newport is a live album by Teddy Wilson's Trio and Gerry Mulligan's Quartet recorded at the Newport Jazz Festival in 1957 and released on the Verve label.

Reception

Allmusic stated "Although in 1957 some listeners considered swing and cool jazz to be at the extreme poles of the jazz world, this LP, recorded at that year's Newport Jazz Festival, shows just how similar the two idioms were".

Track listing
 "Stompin' at the Savoy" (Edgar Sampson, Benny Goodman, Chick Webb, Andy Razaf) - 3:40
 "Airmail Special" (Goodman, Jimmy Mundy, Charlie Christian) - 3:47
 "Basin Street Blues" (Spencer Williams) - 5:07
 "I Got Rhythm" (George Gershwin, Ira Gershwin) - 4:20
 "Sweet Georgia Brown" (Ben Bernie, Maceo Pinkard, Kenneth Casey) - 6:00
 "My Funny Valentine" (Richard Rodgers, Lorenz Hart) - 4:50
 "Utter Chaos" (Gerry Mulligan) - 4:35

Personnel
Teddy Wilson - piano (tracks 1-5)
Gerry Mulligan - baritone saxophone (tracks 5-7)
Bob Brookmeyer - valve trombone (tracks 6 & 7)
Joe Benjamin (tracks 6 & 7), Milt Hinton (tracks 1-5) – bass
Dave Bailey, (tracks 6 & 7), Specs Powell (tracks 1-5) - drums

References

Verve Records live albums
Teddy Wilson live albums
Gerry Mulligan live albums
Albums recorded at the Newport Jazz Festival
1957 live albums
Albums produced by Norman Granz